Popel is a surname with multiple origins. Notable people with this surname include:

 Aleh Popel (born 1983), Belarusian football player
 Esther Popel (1896–1958), African-American poet
 Heike Popel (born 1961), East German luger
 Nikolai Popel (1901–1980), Soviet lieutenant-general
 Stepan Popel (1909–1987), Ukrainian-American chess champion

See also
 
 Popiel (disambiguation), Polish surname
 Poepel
 Pöppel, German surname